Indognorimus costipennis is a species of  scarab beetle in the family of Cetoniinae.

It is found in Assam, northern India.

References

Cetoniinae
Beetles described in 1890